Douglas Alexander Smith is a Canadian actor known for his work on the HBO series Big Love as Ben Henrickson. His other work includes Percy Jackson: Sea of Monsters, Terminator Genisys, Vinyl, Miss Sloane, When We Rise, The Alienist and the second season of HBO's Big Little Lies.

Early life
Smith was born in Toronto, Ontario, Canada, the son of Terrea (née Oster), an American-born teacher, and Maurice Smith, a producer of low-budget films who is originally from the United Kingdom. Smith's mother appeared in several of the films that his father produced during the 1980s. He is the younger brother of actor Gregory Smith.

Career
Smith has been acting since he was cast as Malvolio in his fourth grade production of Shakespeare's comedy Twelfth Night. Audiences first saw him on the big screen as a young version of Brendan Fraser's character in Blast from the Past (1999). As a teenager, he went to Australia to play the lead role as an American boy living in Australia in a series called Out There. Early in his career, Smith made several appearances on television procedurals, including CSI: Crime Scene Investigation, CSI: Miami, Close to Home, Family Law, The X-Files, Crossing Jordan, and Cold Case.

Smith is known for his regular role as Ben Henrickson on the HBO series Big Love, which aired for five seasons. He also played the role of Edward Porris in Brandon Cronenberg's directorial debut, Antiviral. The film competed in the Un Certain Regard section at the 2012 Cannes Film Festival and took home the award for Best First Canadian Feature at the 2012 Toronto International Film Festival.

In late 2012, Smith filmed the musical/comedy/horror film Stage Fright. He played the roles of both Metal Killer and Buddy, performing two musical numbers in the film. Stage Fright premiered at the 2014 SXSW Film Festival and was released by Magnolia Pictures.

In 2013, he starred as Tyson, the cyclops half-brother of Percy Jackson in the film Percy Jackson: Sea of Monsters. He also began production for his lead role in the horror film Ouija for Universal/Platinum Dunes at the end of 2013.

An alumnus of RADA's Shakespeare Summer School, Smith made his off Broadway debut in 2014, starring in the New York premiere of Simon Stephens' Punk Rock at the Lucille Lortel Theatre in the West Village. He played William Carlisle. The production and Smith's performance received favorable reviews. David Rooney of The Hollywood Reporter wrote, "In such an exemplary cast, it's unfair to single out any one of the seven principal actors for special praise. But Smith, best known for HBO's Big Love, is sad, scary and transfixing." The production was nominated for both OBIE and Drama League Awards.

In 2015, Smith played a minor role in Terminator Genisys. He had a significant arc on HBO's Vinyl in 2016. He then returned to the horror genre in The Bye Bye Man, where he starred in the role of Elliot.

In 2017, he portrayed Dustin Lance Black in When We Rise, an eight-part docudrama based on the memoirs of LGBT activist Cleve Jones directed by Gus Van Sant, Dustin Lance Black, Dee Rees and Thomas Schlamme. Soon after, Smith joined the cast of The Alienist, a 19th-century crime drama created by Cary Fukunaga based on the 1994 novel The Alienist. His turn as one half of the darkly comedic Isaacson duo earned praise from critics like David Nevins of The Guardian who, in his review of the show, wrote: "Two of the best performances, though, are those of Matthew Shear and Douglas Smith as the brothers Isaacson, two bright and innovative Jewish forensic science specialists who stick out like sore thumbs in the very Irish-Catholic environs of Manhattan law enforcement."

In 2019, Smith played an integral role in the second season of HBO's Big Little Lies as Corey Brockfield, a co-worker and love interest of main character Jane Chapman. He, along with the rest of the cast, were nominated for the Screen Actors Guild Award for Outstanding Performance by an Ensemble in a Drama Series.

In 2020, he reprised his role as Marcus Isaacson in the second season of The Alienist.

In 2022, he played the supporting role of Bill Johnson in Olivia Wilde's film Don't Worry Darling. He also starred in the musical drama The Swearing Jar, which premiered at the 2022 Toronto International Film Festival.

Personal life
He has been married to Teesh Travis since April 2018.

Filmography

Awards and nominations

References

External links

1985 births
Living people
Male actors from Toronto
American male child actors
American male film actors
American people of English descent
American male television actors
Canadian male child actors
Canadian male film actors
Canadian people of American descent
Canadian people of English descent
Canadian male television actors
21st-century Canadian male actors
20th-century Canadian male actors